Presidential elections were held in Paraguay on 11 July 1954, following a military coup on 8 May 1954 which toppled Federico Chávez who had been re-elected the previous year. At the time, the Colorado Party was the only legally permitted party. Alfredo Stroessner, who had led the coup, ran as the Colorado candidate in a special election for the remainder of Chávez' term, and was elected unopposed.

This was the first of Stroessner's eight consecutive election victories.

Results

References

Paraguay
Presidential election
Presidential elections in Paraguay
Single-candidate elections
Alfredo Stroessner
Paraguayan presidential election
Election and referendum articles with incomplete results